Bruno Arcari (15 November 1915 – 10 December 2004) was an Italian footballer player and coach, who played as a forward.

Club career
Arcari played for nine seasons (197 games, 42 goals) in the Serie A for A.S. Livorno Calcio, Genova 1893, Milan, and Bologna F.C. 1909.

International career
Arcari played his only game for the Italy national team on 3 March 1940, in a 1–1 draw against Switzerland.

Personal life
Burno's older brothers Carlo Arcari, Angelo Arcari and Pietro Arcari all played football professionally. To distinguish them, Carlo was referred to as Arcari I, Angelo as Arcari II, Pietro as Arcari III and Bruno as Arcari IV.

References

External links
 
 Profile at magliarossonera
 Profile at FIGC

1915 births
2004 deaths
Italian footballers
Association football forwards
Italy international footballers
Serie A players
Serie B players
U.S. Livorno 1915 players
Genoa C.F.C. players
A.C. Milan players
Bologna F.C. 1909 players
Brescia Calcio players
U.S. Cremonese players
A.C. Reggiana 1919 players
Taranto F.C. 1927 players
Piacenza Calcio 1919 players
S.G. Gallaratese A.S.D. players
Italian football managers
A.C. Monza managers
A.C.R. Messina managers
U.S. Catanzaro 1929 managers
S.S.D. Lucchese 1905 managers
Parma Calcio 1913 managers
Piacenza Calcio 1919 managers